The CIA and the Cult of Intelligence is a 1974 controversial non-fiction political book written by Victor Marchetti, a former special assistant to the Deputy Director of the Central Intelligence Agency, and John D. Marks, a former officer of the United States Department of State.

Content
The book discusses how the CIA works and how its original purpose (i.e. collecting and analyzing information about foreign governments, corporations, and persons in order to advise public policymakers) has, according to the author, been subverted by its obsession with clandestine operations. 

It is the first book the federal government of the United States ever went to court to censor before its publication. The CIA demanded the authors delete 339 passages but they resisted and in the end only 168 passages were deleted. The publisher, Alfred A. Knopf, published the book with blanks for deleted passages and with boldface type for items which the CIA initially wanted deleted, but later withdrew its objections. It is perhaps the earliest published book to adopt this format.

The book was a critically acclaimed bestseller whose publication contributed to the establishment of the Church Committee, a United States Senate select committee to study governmental operations with respect to intelligence activities, in 1975. The book was published in paperback by Dell Publishing in 1975.

Cult of intelligence
Victor Marchetti used the expression "cult of intelligence" to denounce what he viewed as a counterproductive mindset and culture of secrecy, elitism, amorality and lawlessness within and surrounding the Central Intelligence Agency in the service of American imperialism:

Critical reception
In his 1978 memoir, Honorable Men: My Life in the CIA, William Colby, a former Director of the Central Intelligence Agency, endorsed Marchetti's critique and adopted the use of the expression "cult of intelligence":

In popular culture
In reaction to Marchetti's use of the expression "cult of intelligence", it has also come to be used by some writers of conspiracy theory and conspiracy fiction to describe a cabal, with a pyramid-shaped hierarchy, which is fanatically devoted to gathering information, often of an esoteric or occult nature.

References

See also 
CIA influence on public opinion
Family Jewels (Central Intelligence Agency)
Kerry Committee report
Philip Agee
Pike Committee
 
United States House Permanent Select Committee on Intelligence
United States President's Commission on CIA activities within the United States
United States Senate Select Committee on Intelligence

1974 non-fiction books
American political books
Non-fiction books about the Central Intelligence Agency
Books about the Cold War
Non-fiction books about espionage
Alfred A. Knopf books